The Relief Project is an organization of musicians who want to deliver aid to communities in need.

Brad Corrigan, a member of Dispatch, and Jon-Erik Borgen a member of J.E. Borgen, established The Relief Project. The initial goal of the project was to help the victims of Hurricane Katrina and other people caught in mass disasters throughout the world.  Started by two musicians, nineteen other musicians donated a piece of music that together became a CD called The Relief Project, Vol 1.

The Relief Project promoted a concert at Irving Plaza.  This concert was performed in front of a sold-out crowd of 1,000 and some of the featured artists who performed at Irving Plaza were Dispatch, State Radio, Stephen Kellogg, Braddigan, Pete Francis, Kate Voegele, and J.E. Borgen.  The Relief Project gave $18,000 to the Community Service Center of New Orleans and to Save the Children's operations in Sudan and Pakistan.

The mission of The Relief Project is
“to use music as a tool to rebuild lives; To use music as a tool to rebuild lives; a bridge to bring cultures together in the fight against poverty; and a voice calling for the protection and liberation of displaced and orphaned children the world over”.

The vision of The Relief Project is to use music as a way to raise money, educate and inspire people to engage in a livelier role in caring for humanity

See also
 Empty bowls
 Artists for Humanity

External links 
 Organization website

Music organizations based in the United States